The 2018–19 season is FC Viktoria Plzeň's 26th season in the Czech First League. The team is competing in Czech First League, the Czech Cup, and the UEFA Champions League.

Pavel Vrba returned to manage the club in the summer of 2017. He had previously served as manager from 2008 to 2013 before leaving to manage the national team.

Players

Out on loan

Transfers

In

Out

Pre-season and friendlies

Competitions

Czech First League

Regular stage

League table

Results summary

Results by round

Matches

Championship group

League table

Results summary

Results by round

Matches

Czech Cup

UEFA Champions League

Group stage

UEFA Europa League

Knockout phase

Round of 32

References

Viktoria Plzen
FC Viktoria Plzeň seasons
Viktoria Plzen
Viktoria Plzen